Jan Marcus Posthuma (born 11 June 1963 in Dokkum, Friesland) is a retired volleyball player from the Netherlands, who represented his native country in three consecutive Summer Olympics, starting in 1988 in Seoul, South Korea.

After having won the silver medal in 1992, Posthuma won the gold medal in Atlanta, Georgia (1996) with the Dutch Men's Volleyball National Team by defeating Italy in the final (3-2).

Individual awards
 1992 FIVB World League "Best Digger"

References
  Dutch Olympic Committee

1963 births
Living people
Dutch men's volleyball players
Volleyball players at the 1988 Summer Olympics
Volleyball players at the 1992 Summer Olympics
Volleyball players at the 1996 Summer Olympics
Olympic volleyball players of the Netherlands
Olympic gold medalists for the Netherlands
Olympic silver medalists for the Netherlands
Olympic medalists in volleyball
People from Dokkum
Sportspeople from Friesland
Medalists at the 1996 Summer Olympics
Medalists at the 1992 Summer Olympics
20th-century Dutch people
21st-century Dutch people